The Kassel RegioTram is a  tram-train light rail system in Kassel, Hesse, Germany.

Kassel's tram-train system follows the Karlsruhe model, and has been in full operation since 2007. With special RegioTram tramcars, continuous trips between the Deutsche Bahn heavy rail network and Kassel's city tram network are easily possible, thus avoiding transfers requiring long walking distances between trains of the regional rail system and trams of the Kassel city system.

The operator of the RegioTram network was, until December 2013, RegioTram mbH, a joint venture between Regionalbahn Kassel (RBK), a subsidiary of the Kasseler Verkehrs-Gesellschaft (KVG), and DB Regio. Since 9 December 2013, the RegioTram is operated by a consortium of the KVG and Hessische Landesbahn (HLB). The system is integrated in the Nordhessischer Verkehrsverbund (NVV).

Concept 

The implementation of the RegioTram project includes various interlocking measures to improve local public transport in Kassel. The aim of the project is to link Kassel's local tram network with the regional rail network so that tram-train vehicles can travel from the city's tram network into the surrounding countryside on regional railroad tracks. The core component of the Kassel RegioTram project is a newly created link between the two rail systems at the Kassel Hauptbahnhof. The development of the infrastructure required to allow for a 30-minute headways on all lines will be implemented by 2014 at the earliest.

Operations

Services 

Rolling stock 

RegioTram operates using 28 tramcars from Alstom RegioCitadis delivered in 2004. There are two versions of these tramcars: 18 dual voltage tram-trains for use on the electrified network in and outside of Kassel, and 10 hybrid tram-trains (DC/diesel) for use with a diesel engine outside Kassel on the section around Wolfhagen. Similar vehicles of the same model are also in use on RandstadRail in the Netherlands.

History 

Preliminary operations started on 10 June 2001, initially with six borrowed Saarbahn tramcars, on the Warburg–Kassel line. Thus, the previous regional railway timetable was now being served by the new vehicles. RegioTram operation with 30-minute headways was realized. RegioCitadis type vehicles manufactured by Alstom in Salzgitter were delivered in July 2004, and took over the operation on this line on 8 May 2005; the borrowed Saarbahn tramcars were then returned. This route is now served by RegioTram Line 3 (RT3).

Starting on 29 January 2006, the first RegioTram operations began on the Kassel tram rail network itself. The hybrid RegioTram vehicles joined the tram tracks in the downtown core of Kassel on the Lossetalbahn to Hessisch Lichtenau during peak hours, the terminus of the tram line. The diesel-electric vehicles used a direct route over the Waldkappel rail line between Ober- and Nieder-Kaufungen which is not electrified. This meant, in contrast to the trams which served all stops, a reduction in journey time. In August 2007, the switch to the continuous use of conventional tramcar vehicles on this line was made. The former tram-train runs over the non-electrified railway through Waldkappel were replaced by tram "express" trips that do not operate at all stops along the route.

Starting 1 June 2006, RegioTram operations from Kassel Hauptbahnhof, through Baunatal, Guxhagen and Körle, to Melsungen, began. This RegioTram Line 5 (RT5) runs alternately once and twice every hour.

Operations between Kassel and Wolfhagen, through Ahnatal and Zierenberg, began on 10 December 2006 on RegioTram Line 4 (RT4).

Between 16 September 2007 and the timetable change in December 2007, the RegioTram Line 9 (RT9) operated in advance from Kassel Hauptbahnhof to Treysa.

RegioTram routes in Kassel changed 19 August 2007 (RT4), 16 September 2007 (RT3 and RT5) and December 20097 (RT9) from running to the Innenstadtring (Inner Rign Road) in downtown, and instead to Leipziger Straße.  The full development of the infrastructure to allow for a 30-minute headways on all lines will be implemented by 2014 at the earliest.

On the lines RT3 and RT4, new stops at Kassel-Jungfernkopf, and Vellmar-Osterberg/EKZ on the Harleshäuser Kurve, were put into operation on 13 December 2008. On 25 April 2009, a new station Kassel-Kirchditmold was also added to the same section. In Melsungen, a new stop at Melsungen-Bartenwetzerbrücke was put into operation on the RT5 on 20 May 2011.

See also
 Trams in Kassel
 Tram-train
 List of town tramway systems in Germany
 Trams in Germany

References

Inline references

Bibliography

External links

 Kasseler Verkehrs-Gesellschaft (KVG) – official site
 

Kassel
Kassel
Transport in Hesse
North Hesse